The Billiards Section of Futebol Clube do Porto is a professional billiards team based in Porto, Portugal, founded in 1950. The team competes in the Portuguese Billiards League and in European Championships, in both carom billiards (three-cushion) and pool (eight-ball and nine-ball) events. They play their home games in the former headquarters of the club and they also have a billiards school, the first in the country.

The most important achievements in this section history were the four silver medals won in 1998–99, 2007–08, 2011–12 and 2015–16 in the European Cup, having also achieved six bronze medals in this competition in 1971–72, 1995–96, 2004–05, 2010–11, 2013–14 and 2014–15. 

In Portugal, the men's and women's squads have achieved many championships, as well as many other trophies making the section one of the most titled in the country. One of the greatest players of this section, Alípio Jorge Fernandes, received the Galardão de Ouro in representation of the president Pinto da Costa, a trophy attributed to the club because of its accomplishments.

Current squads
According to the official website.

Honours
According to Porto's official website and the Portuguese Billiards Federation Portal.

Three-cushion (Men)

Domestic competitions
Portuguese Championship
Winners (26): 1971–72, 1975–76, 1980–81, 1982–83, 1983–84, 1987–88, 1992–93, 1993–94, 1996–97, 1999–00, 2001–02, 2002–03, 2004–05, 2005–06, 2006–07, 2007–08, 2010–11, 2011–12, 2012–13, 2013–14, 2015–16, 2016–17, 2017–18, 2018–19, 2020–21, 2021–22

Portuguese Cup
Winners (18): 1983–84, 1993–94, 1994–95, 2001–02, 2002–03, 2003–04, 2005–06, 2006–07, 2007–08, 2010–11, 2011–12, 2012–13, 2013–14, 2014–15, 2016–17, 2017–18, 2018–19, 2021–22

Portuguese Super Cup
Winners (16): 1993–94, 1996–97, 1999–00, 2000–01, 2002–03, 2003–04, 2005–06, 2007–08, 2010–11, 2011–12, 2012–13, 2013–14, 2014–15, 2015–16, 2017–18, 2018–19

Aperture Tournament / North Zone
Winners (8): 2010–11, 2011–12, 2012–13, 2014–15, 2015–16, 2016–17, 2018–19, 2019–20

European competitions
CEB European Cup / Club Teams
 Winners (2): 2016–17, 2021–22
 2nd place (5): 1998–99, 2007–08, 2011–12, 2015–16, 2018–19
 3rd place (7): 1971–72, 1995–96, 2004–05, 2010–11, 2013–14, 2014–15, 2017–18

Pool (Men)
Portuguese Championship
Winners (3): 2000–01, 2001–02, 2002–03

Portuguese Cup
Winners (2): 2001–02, 2002–03

Portuguese Super Cup
Winners (2): 2001–02, 2002–03

Pool (Women)
Portuguese Championship
Winners (14): 1997–98, 2002–03, 2004–05, 2005–06, 2006–07, 2007–08, 2010–11, 2012–13, 2014–15, 2015–16, 2016–17, 2017–18, 2018–19, 2020–21

Portuguese Cup
Winners (15): 1997–98, 1998–99, 1999–00, 2001–02, 2002–03, 2003–04, 2004–05, 2006–07, 2007–08, 2008–09, 2011–12, 2014–15, 2015–16, 2018–19, 2020–21

Portuguese Super Cup
Winners (13): 1997–98, 2002–03, 2003–04, 2004–05, 2006–07, 2007–08, 2009–10, 2010–11, 2011–12, 2012–13, 2014–15, 2016–17, 2018–19

Snooker (Men)
Portuguese Championship
Winners (2): 2015–16, 2016–17

Portuguese Cup
Winners (1): 2016–17

Portuguese Super Cup
Winners (1): 2015–16

References

External links
Official website
 FC Porto Bilhar 
 Federação Portuguesa de Bilhar  

FC Porto
Cue sports teams
Cue sports in Portugal
Sports clubs established in 1950
1950 establishments in Portugal